Yuyang District, is a district of Yulin, Shaanxi, China, bordering Inner Mongolia to the west.

Administrative divisions
As 2019, Yuyang District is divided to 6 subdistricts, 14 towns and 5 townships.
Subdistricts

Towns

Townships

See also
Hongliutan, Zhenchuan, Yuyang

References

Districts of Shaanxi
Yulin, Shaanxi